Shmuel T. Meyer is a French-Israeli author. He won the Prix Goncourt in 2021 for his short story trilogy, Et la guerre est finie...

References

1957 births
Living people
21st-century French male writers
Prix Goncourt de la nouvelle recipients
21st-century French novelists
French male novelists